Rhamphomyia erythrophthalma is a species of fly in the family Empididae. It is found in the Palearctic.

References

External links
Images representing Rhamphomyia at BOLD
Ecology of Commanster

Rhamphomyia
Insects described in 1830
Asilomorph flies of Europe